Boghiș is a commune located in Sălaj County, Crișana, Romania. Established in 2005 by being split off from Nușfalău, it is composed of two villages, Boghiș and Bozieș (Szilágyborzás).

Sights 
 Reformed church in Boghiș, built in the 18th century (1792–1796)
 Reformed church in Bozieș, built in the 16th century

References

Communes in Sălaj County
Localities in Crișana